Lane Nishikawa is a Japanese American actor, filmmaker, playwright and performance artist who was born in Wahiawa, Hawaii and is Sansei (third generation Japanese American). His work often deals with Asian American history and identity issues. He is widely known for a series of one-man shows, including Life in the Fast Lane, I'm on a Mission From Buddha, Mifune and Me and others.  In 2005 he directed the independent feature film, Only the Brave, a fictional account of the rescue of the Lost Battalion by the 100th Infantry Battalion/442nd Regimental Combat Team, a segregated Japanese American fighting unit during World War II.  Nishikawa also starred in the lead role.  He has written and directed two short films about World War II veterans, Forgotten Valor and  When We Were Warriors.

Nishikawa has a long history in Asian-American theater, having served as artistic director for the Asian American Theater Company, in San Francisco, California for 10 seasons.  He was co-artistic director of the Eureka Theatre and resident director at the San Francisco Shakespeare Festival.

Honors 
Profiles of Excellence Award – ABC-TV
Harvard Foundation Honoree
Ruby Yoshino Schaar Playwright Award – National JACL
NEA Solo Performance Fellowship

Notes

External links 

 
Lane Nishikawa bio on onlythebravemovie.com

Living people
American performance artists
American film directors of Japanese descent
Male actors from Honolulu
Year of birth missing (living people)
American male actors of Japanese descent
American male film actors
American film actors of Asian descent
Writers from Honolulu
Film directors from Hawaii